LaLa is a monthly Japanese  manga magazine published by Hakusensha on the 24th of each month. The magazine's bonus contents are usually calendars for New Year issues, drama CDs, and so on. In a 2006 survey conducted by Oricon, Japanese girls selected LaLa as their fifth favorite manga anthology, along with Shogakukan's Shōjo Comic and Kodansha's Weekly Shōnen Magazine.

About
LaLa is the second  manga magazine Hakusensha published. Manga serialized in LaLa are collected into  under the label , along with manga serialized in Hana to Yume. Fanbooks and illustration books for its series are published under the label .

Readers of the magazine are 97% female, while the other 3% are male readers. Its age demographic consists of 4% percent for under-13 readers, 23.4% for readers aged 13–17, 20% for readers aged 18–20, 13% for readers aged 21–23, while the remaining 29.7% of the readers are aged 24 years old and up. Readers aged 24 and up are the demographic of the highest percentage.

History
LaLa began its publication in July 1976 as a sister magazine to Hana to Yume. It was originally titled  and published bi-monthly. The magazine's first issue featured Ryoko Yamagishi's  and was priced at 290 yen. The magazine's first editor-in-chief was Nobumasa Konagai. The current editor-in-chief is Ikushū Ichikawa.

In September 1977, the magazine changed its frequency and became a monthly magazine. It then became its own independent magazine.

In 1985, Hakusensha started irregularly publishing special publications of LaLa under different titles. It started with LaLa Deluxe, published seasonally. LaLa Deluxe later became the magazine's sister magazine LaLa DX.

Since the publication of LaLa Deluxe, various special or supplement issues have been published.  was the first supplemental issue for LaLa. It was first published in Summer 1982 and ended in Spring 1984.  succeeded Bessatsu LaLa: Bessatsu RaRa and was published bi-monthly from 1984 to 1985.

My LaLa, a special edited compilation of the magazine, was published from Autumn 1984 to Spring 1985.  was published from Summer 1985 to June 1986, for a total of five issues.

 then replaced LaLa Special Wendy. The first issue of LaLa Special Cindy was published from Summer 1986 to Autumn 1986. It was later revived for two issues, which were published from the Autumn to the Winter 1987 issues.

Since 2004, special or supplemental issues of LaLa have been published as LaLa Special, which serializes LaLas side stories of the related series, as well as featuring various manga artists' one-shots.

Television commercials
The magazine had a series of commercials directed by Shō Yanagisawa called . This series of commercials won the Grand Prix award in the film category for "Best of Communication Media and Publication" in Ad Fest 2009.  and  also won two silver medals in the same event. The series was also named as one of the "Gold Stars" in the 2nd Ad Stars 2009 Busan International Advertising Festival.

Serializations

Current

 Natsume's Book of Friends (2005–present)
 Snow White with the Red Hair (2006–present)
 School Babysitters (2009–present)

Past

1976–1989

 Wata no Kunihoshi (1978–1987)
 Hi Izuru Tokoro no Tenshi (1980–1984)
 Cipher (1984–1990)
 Sakura no Sono (1985–1986)
 Hanasakeru Seishōnen (1987–1994)
 Mikan Enikki (1988–1995)
 Moon Child (1989–1993)

1990–1999

 Eight Clouds Rising (1992–2002)
 From Far Away (1993–2003)
 Jyu-Oh-Sei (1993–2003)
 Kaguyahime (1994–2005)
 Kare Kano: His and Her Circumstances (1996–2005)
 Okojo-san (1996–2005)
 Land of the Blindfolded (1998–2004)
 Omukae desu (1999–2002)
 Captive Hearts (1999–2002)
 Venus in Love (1999–2004)

2000–2009

 Haruka: Beyond the Stream of Time (2000–2013)
 The Recipe for Gertrude (2001–2003)
 Millennium Snow (2001–2002)
 MeruPuri (2002–2004)
 Pearl Pink (2002–2004)
 Ouran High School Host Club (2002–2010)
 Demon Sacred (2003–2007)
 Beauty is the Beast (2002–2004)
 La Corda d'Oro (2004–2011)
 Palette of 12 Secret Colors (2004–2008)
 Me & My Brothers (2004–2009)
 Vampire Knight (2004–2013)
 Zig Zag (2004–2008)
 Maid Sama! (2005–2013)
 Wanted (2005)
 Two Flowers for the Dragon (2005–2009)
 Ballad of a Shinigami (2005)
 Penguin Revolution (2005–2007)
 Flower in a Storm (2006–2010)
 Faster than a Kiss (2007–2012)
 The Secret Notes of Lady Kanoko (2007–2009)
 Library War (2007–2014)
 Eensy Weensy Monster (2007)
 Chotto Edo Made (2008–2011)
 Koi Dano Ai Dano (2009–2016)

2010–2019

 Last Game (2011–2016)
 Meteor Prince (2013–2014)
 Kawaii Tanuki mo Raku ja nai (2017–2022)
 Reverse X Rebirth (2019–2021)

References

External links
  
 A history of the magazine at Comic Natalie 
 

1976 establishments in Japan
Hakusensha magazines
Magazines established in 1976
Magazines published in Tokyo
Monthly manga magazines published in Japan
Shōjo manga magazines